India participated in the 2002 Commonwealth Games in Manchester. Notable among the players was the Indian women's hockey team. The team entered the finals after defeating the Australian women's national field hockey team. They went on to receive the Gold after winning the final game against the English women's hockey team. This win also marked a comeback for Mir Ranjan Negi who coached the team. Negi's involvement and the Gold inspired the successful 2007 Shahrukh Khan film about women's field hockey, Chak De India.

Medals
India came fourth overall in the medals table, behind Australia, England and Canada, repeating the feat at the 2006 Commonwealth Games. India was also the host nation for the 2010 Commonwealth Games, which was held at Delhi, India's Capital.

Gold Medalists

| style="text-align:left; vertical-align:top;"|

|

Silver Medalists

| style="text-align:left; vertical-align:top;"|

|

Bronze Medalists

| style="text-align:left; vertical-align:top;"|

|

India's Teams at the 2002 Commonwealth Games

India women's national field hockey team
Kanti Baa
Suman Bala
Sanggai Chanu
Tingonleima Chanu
Ngasepam Pakpi Devi
Suraj Lata Devi (c)
Sita Gussain
Saba Anjum Karim
Amandeep Kaur
Manjinder Kaur
Mamta Kharab
Jyoti Sunita Kullu
Helen Mary
Anjali
Pritam Rani Siwach
Sumrai Tete

See also
2002 Commonwealth Games results

Notes

External links
 Commonwealth Games News
Commonwealth Games Results: India

India at the Commonwealth Games
Nations at the 2002 Commonwealth Games
2002 in Indian sport